(born 6 July 1977) is a Japanese professional golfer.

Yano has won three tournaments on the Japan Golf Tour and featured in the top 100 of the Official World Golf Rankings.

Professional wins (5)

Japan Golf Tour wins (3)

Japan Challenge Tour wins (2)

Results in major championships

CUT = missed the half-way cut
"T" = tied for place

Results in World Golf Championships

References

External links

Yano Azuma Official Blog 

Japanese male golfers
Japan Golf Tour golfers
Sportspeople from Gunma Prefecture
1977 births
Living people